Fuyuan is under the administration of Qujing City, in the east of Yunnan province, China, bordering Guizhou province to the east.

Administrative divisions
Fuyuan County has 2 subdistricts, 9 towns and 1 ethnic township. 
2 subdistricts
 Zhong'an
 Shengjing
9 towns

1 ethnic township
 Gugan Shui

Climate

Transportation
The county has one high-speed rail station, Fuyuan North, on the Shanghai–Kunming high-speed railway. There are also three stations on the conventional Panxi railway.

References

External links
Fuyuan County Official Website

County-level divisions of Qujing